Zaia is an Italian surname. Notable people with the surname include:

Luca Zaia (born 1968), Italian politician
Meelis Zaia (born 1956), Assyrian Metropolitan

See also
Zara (name)

Italian-language surnames